A by-election was held in the state electoral district of The Hills on 28 August 1993. The by-election was triggered by Tony Packard resigning after he was convicted of charges relating to the unlawful use of listening devices at his car dealership.

Dates

Result

Tony Packard resigned.

See also
Electoral results for the district of The Hills
List of New South Wales state by-elections

References

1993 elections in Australia
New South Wales state by-elections
1990s in New South Wales
August 1993 events in Australia